Sjors Kramer (born 19 April 2000) is a Dutch professional footballer who plays as a defender.

Club career
On 22 June 2022, Volendam announced that Kramer will take 6 months off from football to travel through Peru and Colombia and then will join Rijnsburgse Boys in early 2023.

References

2000 births
Living people
Dutch footballers
FC Volendam players
Tweede Divisie players
Eerste Divisie players
Association football defenders